Las Gaviotas is an ecovillage located in the Llanos of the Colombian department of Vichada. It was founded in 1971 by Paolo Lugari, who assembled a group of engineers and scientists in an attempt to create a mode of sustainable living in one of the least hospitable political and geographical climates in South America.

History 
Las Gaviotas' pragmatic approach to its survival disassociates the village from many philosophies and political ideologies. Originally, the project received funding from the United Nations and similar groups seeking environmentally friendly solutions to population growth and Third World development.

When these original donors began to pull funding from Las Gaviotas in the 1990s, the villagers looked elsewhere for their income. They realized that the impressive pine forest was a sustainable source of pine resin used in the production of a wide variety of products like turpentine and violins.

Their terraformation of the llanos allows Las Gaviotas to thrive, but it is not an example of low impact ecology practised by many eco-villages. Las Gaviotas is largely apolitical, a strategy which has allowed it to grow amidst the cocaine growers, paramilitary and insurgent guerrilla groups, and military troops present in the llanos. The village is further separated from many eco-anarchist movements because of its early ties to the United Nations and the Colombian government.

Climate
Las Gaviotas has a hot and humid tropical monsoon climate (Köppen Am) with a short dry season from December to February.

Environmental impact 
It is estimated that, in pre-Columbian times, the llanos were an extension of the Amazonian rain forest, but the rainforest border has been receding from the area for centuries. The Las Gaviotas village is noted for the planting of over 1.5 million trees in the area. While the trees were originally part of an experiment to see if any significant growth could occur in the desiccated soil of the llanos, they have become a significant feature of the grasslands.  As a result of the shade these trees provide and the tropical climate of the area, the groundcover began hosting tropical rainforest species which are native to the region. Resin harvested from the planted trees has provided Las Gaviotas with a sustainable source of income.

Areas planted with trees saw a decrease in grasses, sedges, and leguminoseae species, and an increase in melastomataceae, dilleniaceae, rubiaceae, hypericaceae species. Planted areas have also seen the development of a complex forest structure with a shrub layer, understory, subcanopy, and canopy.

While the village is largely self-sufficient, it regularly uses diesel fuel during certain seasons.  Currently, a BioDiesel project is under way for market and local use.

Technology 
The community has produced a number of inventions and innovations over the years – notably including a children's seesaw that drives a water pump and a "distinctive 'sunflower' design" windmill that is well-suited to the plains in Colombia. Lugari notes that social experiments cannot simply import solutions from temperate climates. Las Gaviotas has made it a goal to always engineer solutions specific to the problems the community will be facing personally (Gaviotas Rising 1994).

Since already-existing solutions are often very costly to adapt, Las Gaviotas' innovations are often simple changes to a means of production that make otherwise expensive products available at affordable prices.  One of the most widespread Gaviotas developments is a water pump that can tap aquifers six times as deep as conventional pumps with less effort being expended.  While existing pumps in the region raised and lowered a heavy piston in a pipe, the Las Gaviotas engineers created pumps that leave the piston in place and instead lift and lower a cheap, light PVC sleeve around the piston (Weisman 1995).

When leading solar hot water panel manufacturers explained the expenses and complicated manufacture of panels efficient enough to collect sunlight in the often overcast weather of the llanos, the Las Gaviotas engineers crafted homemade solar water-heating panels out of cheap building materials that were better suited to the peculiar climate of the region. The ecovillage also creates some of its own building materials like a unique form of quickcrete brick made with the dirt of the region.

Healthcare advances 
The Las Gaviotas crew created a self-powered, functional hospital in 1980 which treated a substantial number of indigenous people who worked in the village as well as those in the outlying plains until the Colombian government passed legislation pressuring the hospital to close its doors in the 1990s.  While the hospital is no longer operational, the application of Gaviotas pump technology in the surrounding region has increased the availability of clean water and is a reportedly effective form of disease prevention as long as the locals maintain the pumps (Weisman 1999).

External links
 
"Friends of Gaviotas"

References

Books

Weisman, Alan. A Good Harvest. In Context #42, Context Institute: Fall 1995.  accessed February 20, 2007
Gaviotas Rising. All Things Considered. National Public Radio: Segment #06. August 29, 1994. Transcript #1589

Articles 
Social Design Notes: Gaviotas
Nothing Wasted, Everything Gained
Time for Utopia
Gaviotas: In a War Zone, but Not at War
An Ecologically Sound Paradise in the Middle of a War Zone
Living on Sun, Water, Wind, Grass, and Community
Gaviotas at University of Iowa

Ecovillages
Populated places established in 1971
1971 establishments in Colombia
Populated places in the Vichada Department